The Pickerill and Juliet gas fields are decommissioned natural gas producing facilities in the UK sector of the southern North Sea. Pickerill was in operation from 1992 until 2018 and Juliet from 2014 to 2018.

The fields 
The Pickerill field was discovered in December 1984 by well 48/11b-4. The field is principally located in Block 48/11a and 48/11b and extends into Blocks 48/12c and 48/17b. The gas reservoir is a Rotliegend sandstone. At the time of start-up, the field was jointly owned by ARCO British Ltd (43.34%), British Sun Oil Co Ltd (23.33%), Superior Oil (UK) Ltd (20.00%), Deminex UK Oil & Gas Ltd (10.00%), and Canadian Superior Oil (UK) Ltd (3.33%). The field was anticipated to have recoverable reserves of 16.2 billion cubic metres.

The Juliet gas field is located to the west of Pickerill in Block 47/14b. It was owned by Neptune E&P Ltd.

Development 
The Pickerill field was developed by ARCO by two unattended offshore installations Pickerill A and Pickerill B, with gas transmitted by pipeline from Pickerill A to Theddlethorpe Gas Terminal (TGT), Lincolnshire. The main design parameters of the installations is shown in the table.  

Gas treatment facilities on the installations were minimal. Normally gas from the wellheads was routed to the production manifold and then to the export line. There was a Test Separator with metering of the individual gas, condensate and water streams. There was a wet well separator for removing water from well fluids. There was also a pig launcher on each platform and a pig receiver on Pickerill A for the Pickerill B to A pipeline.

New pipeline reception facilities and process plant was installed at TGT as part of the Pickerill development.

Perenco assumed ownership of the Pickerill field in 2004.

The Juliet development comprised two subsea wells and their wellhead protection structures (WHPS) producing to a manifold centre. 

From the manifold well fluids flowed to Pickerill A via a 22 km long 12” diameter pipeline (PL3121). Reception facilities (the Juliet Emergency Shutdown Valve and a temporary pig receiver) at Pickerill A were located on a sub-cellar deck. Fluids were routed to the export line to TGT. Juliet was controlled from Pickerill A via a control umbilical. 

Pickerill A and B were both unmanned and controlled from the Bacton Control Room.

Production 
The production profile, in mcm/y, of the Pickerill field was as shown.The cumulative gas production from Pickerill from 1992 to the end of 2014 was 12,315 million cubic metres.

Decommissioning 
The Theddlethorpe Gas Terminal closed in August 2018. Gas export from Pickerill and Juliet ceased and the installations were shut-down. Subsequently their wells were plugged and abandoned and all structures above the seabed were removed.

See also 

 Theddlethorpe Gas Terminal
 List of oil and gas fields of the North Sea
 Caister Murdoch System gas fields
 Lincolnshire Offshore Gas Gathering System
 Viking gas field
 Bacton Gas Terminal

References 

North Sea energy
North Sea
Natural gas fields in the United Kingdom